Greatest Hits Live! is the first live album released by American hard rock singer and guitarist Lita Ford. The first track of the album is a new song recorded at EMI Studios in Hollywood. The rest of the album was recorded in an unknown location in Southern California, probably during the Dangerous Curves tour.

The album was re-issued in 2004 by Cleopatra Records with the title In Concert and again by Deadline Records in 2006 with the original title and a slightly different cover.

Track listing
"Nobody's Child" (Lita Ford, Michael Dan Ehmig, Glen Burtnik) - 4:23
"Larger Than Life" (Ehmig, Ford, Myron Grombacher) - 4:20
"What Do You Know about Love" (Randy Cantor, Michael Caruso, Cal Curtis) – 3:59
"Black Widow" (Ehmig, David Ezrin, Ford, Joe Taylor) - 3:47
"Holy Man" (Ford, Ehmig) - 4:48
"Can't Catch Me" (Ford, Ian Kilmister, Ezrin) - 4:13
"Falling In and Out of Love" (Ford, Ezrin, Nikki Sixx) - 5:43
"Bad Love" (Ford, Ehmig) - 4:53
"The Ripper" (Ford, Ezrin) - 5:17
"Close My Eyes Forever" (Ford, Ozzy Osbourne) - 5:27
"Shot of Poison" (Ford, Jim Vallance, Grombacher) - 3:45
"Hungry" (Ford, Ehmig) - 5:08
"Kiss Me Deadly" (Mick Smiley) - 5:12
"Rock Candy" (Sammy Hagar, Ronnie Montrose) - 6:14

Personnel
Lita Ford - lead vocals, guitars, producer

Studio band
Glen Burtnik - acoustic guitars, backing vocals
Phil Chen - bass
Rodger Carter - drums

Live band
David Ezrin - keyboards, backing vocals
Joe Taylor - guitars, backing vocals
Tommy Caradonna - bass, backing vocals
Jimmy DeGrasso - drums

Production
Ryan Greene - studio engineer
Biff Dawes - live engineer
Bobby Bradley - mixing
Eric Wolf - mastering

References

Lita Ford albums
2000 live albums
Cleopatra Records live albums
Live glam metal albums